Lionel Fournier (19 March 1917 – 3 September 1993) was a Canadian athlete. He competed in the men's decathlon at the 1948 Summer Olympics.

References

1917 births
1993 deaths
Athletes (track and field) at the 1948 Summer Olympics
Canadian decathletes
Olympic track and field athletes of Canada
People from the Municipal District of Pincher Creek No. 9
Sportspeople from Alberta